Koprivshtitsa (pronounced , from the Bulgarian word , kopriva, meaning "nettle") is a historic town in the Koprivshtitsa Municipality in Sofia Province, central Bulgaria, lying on the Topolnitsa River among the Sredna Gora mountains. It was one of the centres of the April uprising in 1876 and is known for its authentic Bulgarian architecture and for its folk music festivals, making it a tourist destination.

Koprivshtitsa preserves the atmosphere of the Bulgarian National Revival period of the 19th century. The town is huddled in the mountain-folds, 111 km east of Sofia. The town has a number of architectural monuments from the period, 383 in all, most of which have been restored to their original appearance. Collections of ethnographical treasures, old weapons, National Revival works of art, fretwork, household weaves and embroidery, national costumes and typical Bulgarian jewelry have also been preserved. It was here that the first shot of the April Uprising against the Ottoman domination was fired in 1876.

Since 1965, the National Festival of Bulgarian Folklore takes place approximately every five years in Koprivshtitsa, gathering musicians, artists and craftsmen from across Bulgaria. Featuring thousands of performing artists in a pastoral setting in the hills above the town, the Koprivshtitsa festival is the only significant Bulgarian music event focusing on amateur performances. The majority of authentic Bulgarian village music records released during Communist rule were recorded in Koprivshtitsa by Balkanton during the 1970s and 1980s.

As of September 2009, the town has a population of 2,541 and the Deputy Mayor is Radka Lukanova Skenderova.

The anthem of the city is "Beautiful, my forest" with lyrics by Lyuben Karavelov and music by Georgi Goranov.

Geography 
The town is located 110 km from the capital Sofia and Pirdop (24 km),90 km north from Plovdiv and Strelcha (22 km). The town is located in a valley along the river Topolnitsa, in a mountainous area, central part of the mountain Sredna Gora.

Climate
In the coldest month, January, the average temperature is −4,2C, while in the hottest, July, 16,8C.

Soil 
In the area of the town Prevail the brown wood soils.

History 
There are a few legends about the foundation of the town. One of them is that the town was a crossroads to the towns Zlatarica, Pirdop and Klisura. Another story tells us that Koprivshtitsa was founded by refugees.
The Orthodox Cathedral was built in 1817. Twenty years later, the first school was founded. The first museum in the town was established in 1930.

Demography
According to the 2011 census, Koprivshtitsa has 2,410 inhabitants. Nearly all of those are ethnic Bulgarians (97.6%). There are also 44 Roma people living in Koprivshtitsa and only 3 ethnic Turks.

Religion 

"Assumption" or "Holy Mother" is the oldest church in Koprivshtitsa, built in 1817.

According to the latest Bulgarian census of 2011, the religious composition, among those who answered the optional question on religious identification, was the following:

Landmarks

 the Oslekov House (1853–1856), today an ethnographical museum
 the Georgi Benkovski Memorial House (1831)
 the Lyuben Karavelov Memorial House complex (1810–1835)
 the Dimcho Debelyanov Memorial House (1830)
 the Todor Kableshkov Memorial House (1845)
 the Lyutov House (1854)
 the Nayden Gerov House
 the Church of the Dormition of the Theotokos (1817)
 the Church of St Nicholas (1839)
 the Memorial Ossuary of April 20 housing the bones of those who died in the April Uprising (1926)
 the bridge where the first shot of the uprising was fired in 1876, Kalachev most (1813)
 the Hadzhi Nencho Palaveev Community Centre (chitalishte) (1869)
 the Sts. Cyril and Methodius School (1837), the first class school in Bulgaria (1837)
 the Street of Handicrafts

Notable people

Born in Koprivshtitsa
 Nayden Gerov (1823–1900), writer
 Yoakim Gruev (1828–1912), teacher and translator
 Lyuben Karavelov (1834–1879), writer
 Georgi Benkovski (1843–1876), revolutionary
 Petko Karavelov (1843–1903), politician
 Todor Kableshkov (1851–1876), revolutionary
 Dimcho Debelyanov (1887–1916), poet

Related to Koprivshtitsa
 Neophyte of Rila (1790–1881), teacher in the town
 John Butler (musician), ancestry in the town, via great-grandfather

Gallery

Twin towns – Sister cities

Koprivshtitsa is twinned with:

 Szentendre in Hungary

See also
 April uprising

References

External links

 Website of Koprivshtitsa
 Video in celebration of the city
 Pictures of Koprivshtitsa
 Koprivshtitsa Folklore Festival, 2010 information
 Anthem Koprivshtitsa in YouTube 
>

Bulgarian culture
Populated places in Sofia Province
 
Towns in Bulgaria